DeDe Lind (born Diane Lind) was an American glamour model famous for her appearance in Playboy magazine as the Playmate of the Month for August 1967.

Biography

Playboy
Lind's photographer friend, Leon, talked her into testing for Playboy. At 19, she was selected to be the Playboy Playmate for August 1967.  The photography was done by Mario Casilli.  Lind received more fan mail than any other Playboy Playmate in history.

Lind's color likeness traveled to space. The November 1969 Playboy calendar photo of Lind was on Apollo XII.  The ground crew for the mission stashed the photo, which they labeled "MAP OF A HEAVENLY BODY" inside a locker aboard the command module Yankee Clipper.  Astronaut Richard Gordon, the commander of the Yankee Clipper, put the photo up for auction in 2011 for a minimum bid of US$1000. The winning bid was for US$21,013.20.

Later career
Lind appeared in the December 1979 issue of Playmates Forever and, in the early 1980s, in the first "Playmate Playoffs" special issue. Her video appearances for Playboy included Race Horses and a frontal-nudity appearance on a sailing yacht. She was also the subject for "Playmates Revisited" in the March 1996 issue.

As of 1999, Lind resided in Boca Raton, Florida.

Filmography
 Playboy: 50 Years of Playmates (2004) (V) 
 Playboy: The Party Continues (2000) (TV)
 Video Centerfold: Sherry Arnett (1985) (V) 
 Playboy After Dark (First Episode) (1968) (TV)

See also
 List of people in Playboy 1960–1969

References

External links
 
 
 Interview with DeDe Lind
 
 

1947 births
2020 deaths
1960s Playboy Playmates
People from Los Angeles